365 Days of Astronomy is an educational podcast, inspired by the International Year of Astronomy, published daily beginning in 2009. It is produced as a collaboration between Southern Illinois University Edwardsville and Astrosphere New Media Association. The individual episodes are written, recorded, and produced by people all around the world. The podcast had 3,000–10,000 listeners each day.

History
In 2008, astronomer Pamela Gay initiated brainstorming via e-mail on possible "new media" programs for 2009, the International Year of Astronomy (IYA). The discussion included Michael Koppelman from Slacker Astronomy, Phil Plait of Bad Astronomy, and others involved in the IYA. Their ideas were distilled down into the 365 Days Of Astronomy podcast. The podcast was to publish one episode per day over the entire year of 2009 and was originally planned to only run for that year.

In 2009, 365 Days of Astronomy released an episode with Ray Bradbury as a guest. During the podcast he spoke about one of his books, The Martian Chronicles, and said "We didn't think we could do it, and we did it! It was quite amazing" referring to the manned moon launches. 

In 2013, the show evolved to add video. In 2015, it joined the UNESCO International Year of Light.

In 2017, 365 Days of Astronomy became a production of the Astronomical Society of the Pacific, when the CosmoQuest grant moved to the ASP and Pamela Gay became the Director of Technology and Citizen Science at the ASP.

Production
The intention is for individuals, schools, companies, and other organizations to record 5 to 10 minutes of audio for each episode. Contributors sign up for a particular day or for up to twelve episodes: one per month. Contributors include both professional and amateur astronomers as well as other scientists, historians, and others with an interest in astronomy. In the first three years of the project, contributors from every continent except Antarctica submitted episodes. Each episode has a common intro and outro that ties it to the overall theme. Avivah Yamani, project manager through 2012, was based in southeast Asia and expressed desire to encourage more diverse participants.

The podcast's theme song, "Far", was written and recorded by George Hrab. A longer version of the song is available on his album Trebuchet, which was released in June 2010.

Contributors
Contributors have included:
Astronomy Cast
Slacker Astronomy
Awesome Astronomy
Columbia University Astronomy
Doug Ellison of Unmannedspaceflight.com
Stuart Lowe of the Jodcast
Ed Sunder of Flintstone Stargazing
Tavi Greiner and Rob Keown of A Sky Full of Stars
The Planetary Society's Planetary Radio

Education and outreach
All of the episodes are archived and can be accessed at any time. The variety of astronomy-related topics and 5 to 10-minute run-time makes the podcast an excellent learning and outreach resource for various venues including star parties, classrooms, home-school, drive-time, or while working at the computer. Topics range from "Why Stargazing is Cool" to "Dark Matter and Dark Energy" to "Will the World End in 2012?".

Parsec award
In 2009, the 365 Days of Astronomy won a Parsec Award for Best Infotainment Podcast. It was one of five finalists and 50 nominees for the award that year. The award was accepted by George Hrab at the 2009 Dragon*Con convention.

References

External links
 

Audio podcasts
Astronomy education podcasts
2009 podcast debuts
2009 establishments in Illinois
American podcasts
Patreon creators